José María Gil-Robles y Quiñones de León (Salamanca, 27 November 1898 – Madrid, 13 September 1980) was a Spanish politician, leader of the CEDA and a prominent figure in the period leading up to the Spanish Civil War. He served as Minister of War from May to December 1935. In the 1936 elections the CEDA was defeated, and support for Gil-Robles and his party evaporated. As Civil War approached, Gil-Robles was unwilling to struggle with Francisco Franco for power and in April 1937 he announced the dissolution of CEDA, and went into exile. Abroad, he negotiated with Spanish monarchists to try to arrive at a common strategy for taking power in Spain. In 1968 he was named a professor of the University of Oviedo and published his book No fue posible la paz ('Peace Was Not Possible'). He was a member of the International Tribunal at the Hague. After the death of Franco and the end of his regime, Gil-Robles became one of the leaders of the "Spanish Christian Democracy" party, which however failed to win support in the Spanish general elections in 1977.

Biography

Early life
José Maria Gil-Robles was born in Salamanca on 27 November 1898. He was the son of Enrique Gil Robles, a conservative Spanish law scholar and a Carlist theorist, whose ancestors were hidalgos from León.  Carlism was a traditionalist political movement in Spain whose goal was to establishing an alternative branch of the Bourbon dynasty.

José María Gil-Robles received his master's degree in 1919 and in 1922 he gained by examination the chair of political law in the University of La Laguna (Tenerife).

Politics
During the dictatorship of Miguel Primo de Rivera he was secretary of the Catholic-Agrarian National Confederation and member of the Writing Council of El Debate. After the declaration of the Second Spanish Republic, he participated in and led the Acción Nacional (National Action) party, later renamed Acción Popular (Popular Action).

In the elections of 1931 he was chosen as a deputy in the Cortes for Salamanca. During the period of the Republic, he maintained the posture of "accidentalism": whether Spain was a monarchy or republic was less important than the law's compatibility with religious principles.

Leader of CEDA

Gil-Robles formed the Spanish Confederation of the Autonomous Right (CEDA), a conservative Catholic party, the political heir to Ángel Herrera Oria's Acción Popular and fought for the "affirmation and defence of the principles of Christian civilization". The CEDA won the largest number of seats in elections of November 1933, and  Gil-Robles was thus the head of the largest party in the Cortes. However, to avoid conflicts with leftist parties, President Niceto Alcalá-Zamora invested Alejandro Lerroux, leader of the Radical Republican Party, as prime minister instead of Gil-Robles.

The appointment of three CEDA ministers to the cabinet in 1934 triggered the leftist Asturian miners' strike that rose, ultimately unsuccessfully, against the government of the Republic. Gil-Robles served as Minister of War under Lerroux from May to December 1935.

1936 elections, defeat and uprising
During the February 1936 Spanish general election, the CEDA formed the largest part of the National Front coalition, which also included Alfonsine monarchists and Carlists. Gil-Robles campaigned under the slogan Todo el poder para el Jefe ("All the power to the Chief"), and while he himself was reelected to the Cortes, the conservative National Front narrowly lost the election, with power swinging to the left. The CEDA itself lost ground, winning 88 seats, fewer than the 115 it had won in 1933.

Following the narrow victory of the leftist Popular Front and the defeat  of the CEDA, support for Gil-Robles and his party declined, losing both votes and membership to the Falange party, founded in 1934, whose share of the vote had been very small in the 1936 elections. Bitterly disillusioned with the failure of their jefe to win the election, the CEDA's youth group Juventudes de Acción Popular went over en masse to the Falange. 

In the following months and in the volatile situation that arose, Gil-Robles was well aware that a coup was being prepared against the government. Despite his later insistence that he had no part in the coup, the CEDA leader was kept informed of each stage of the plot, and members of his party played important liaison roles, facilitating contact between military and civilian plotters. Gil-Robles himself authorized the transfer of 500,000 pesetas of CEDA electoral funds to General Emilio Mola's military insurgents.

Civil War

With the beginning of the Spanish Civil War, following the uprising on 17 July 1936, Gil-Robles found himself unwilling or unable to struggle with Francisco Franco for power. Franco himself was determined not to have competing right-wing parties in Spain, and in April 1937 Gil-Robles announced the dissolution of CEDA. After the Civil War, Gil-Robles went into exile. Abroad, he negotiated with Spanish monarchists to try to arrive at a common strategy for taking power in Spain.

Later life
In 1968 he was named a professor of the University of Oviedo and published his book No fue posible la paz ('Peace Was Not Possible'). He was a member of the International Tribunal at the Hague.

After the death of Franco and the end of his regime, Gil-Robles became one of the leaders of the Spanish Christian Democracy party, which won little support in the Spanish general elections in 1977.

Family

Gil-Robles' son, José María Gil-Robles, was born on 17 June 1935 in Madrid. Like his father, he entered politics, serving as a member of the European Parliament in the European People's Party group, and as President of the European Parliament from 1997 to 1999.

Legacy

Gil-Robles is a unique and controversial figure in the history of Spanish politics. The nature of his political beliefs during the Second Republic either greatly fluctuated or were tailored to his audience, as he is recorded as making many statements that appear contradictory. This is certainly reflected in the nature of his party, the CEDA, which attracted support from both moderate Catholic republicans  and avowed right-wing monarchists.

Judgment of historians
The controversy surrounding him has been best articulated by the historians Paul Preston and Richard Robinson: 
Preston believes that Gil-Robles was essentially a legalist fascist, whose policy of accidentalism would give way to legislating for a fascist dictatorship when he was confident that the populace was controllable. His evidence references Gil Robles' speeches, which were often filled with "anti-democratic and anti-Semitic innuendo", the oppressive, anti-reformist nature of his government partnership with Alejandro Lerroux's Radicals, and the frank admiration offered to foreign fascist regimes by both his propaganda and by his press organ, El Debate. Burnett Bolloten argues Robles was aware of the planned coup and July 1936, he turned over half a million peseta's from CEDA's funds to the generals. However, Bolloten does observe that his support was given in a rather reluctant manner, conditional upon the knowledge that CEDA was disintegrating by this time and he refused to go along with General Mola's request that Spanish right-wing parliamentarians convene at Burgos on 17 July to denounce the government as unlawful.
Robinson, however, rejects any claim that Gil-Robles was anything but a consummate politician struggling to keep the unstable right under control and within the law. The CEDA was not a mere front for fascist aspirations but a party that was based on Catholic values, including a desire to pursue social Catholicism. Gil Robles himself certainly expressed pro-republican views; in an interview with the American journalist Mallory Browne he said, "I am the only friend of the Republic" and was recorded as declaring that "a new dictatorship would produce, after a period of tranquillity, social revolution." Manuel Tardio and Ramon Arango argues that Gil Robles, despite possessing some authoritarian tendencies, did not advocate a dictatorship and neither he nor CEDA stepped beyond the limits of the constitution. Burnett Bolloten observes that Robles refused to seize power with the help of the military and monarchists after becoming war minister in May 1935, something for which they would never forgive him. After the Spanish Right's victory in the November 1933 elections, he maintained support for non-violence and wanted to use evolutionary rather than dictatorial means for achieving his vision of a corporative Spain, despite criticism from monarchists and his own party's youth section.

References

1898 births
1980 deaths
People from Salamanca
Spanish Agrarian Party politicians
Popular Action (Spain) politicians
CEDA politicians
Government ministers during the Second Spanish Republic
Members of the Congress of Deputies of the Second Spanish Republic
Politicians from Castile and León
Spanish people of the Spanish Civil War (National faction)
Academic staff of the University of Oviedo
University of Salamanca alumni
Defence ministers of Spain